Paradise Café is a teen television series that premiered on 6 January 2009 on CBBC Channel and TV2.

It was a co-production between New Zealand's Gibson Group and UK company Initial, a division of Endemol. The first series started on 6 January 2009 and ended on 31 March 2009. The second series premiered in the United Kingdom and New Zealand on 17 January 2011 and the final episode aired on 7 February 2011.

Production
In March 2008, the BBC announced a new 13-part drama series set in New Zealand. The series was filmed in Rarotonga, Cook Islands in mid-2008 and was directed by Danny Mulheron.

The BBC announced in May 2010 that they were currently filming the second series. The character Chloe, played by Amelia Reynolds was written out in the first episode of the second series and a new character, Natasha played by Georgia Fabbish was subsequently introduced. Georgia Fabish had previously played a minor character in the first series. The second series started airing on 17 January 2011 in the United Kingdom and in New Zealand.

Plot
In the ancient times, on Paradise Island, an ancient hero named the Sea Born imprisoned an evil sea ghost called Ragnar in an underwater coral prison along with many other sea ghosts. Ragnar swore revenge against the Sea Born.

The sea ghosts are at the core of the story, and appear in almost every episode. They can be from any country, or period of history, but are the ghosts of people that have died at sea (or near to it, such as an aviator whose plane crashed on the island). They can be invisible, appear as human, or be in their "true sea ghost form" with grey skin covered in black blotches, wearing black and white ragged versions of their human clothes. If seen through water their sea ghost form is revealed. This usually happens when they are seen from behind the fish tank in the Paradise Cafe. Any item, such as money or clothes, given away by a sea ghost will turn into sand after a short time away from the ghost.

Centuries later, Megan and Robbo move to Paradise Island along with their father to open up a café there. Robbo quickly befriends Tai, a kind but very clumsy character whilst Megan eventually gets along with a spoilt, rich girl named Abi. A strange girl named Chloe is eager to get to know everyone on the island and it later discovered by the audience that she is a sea ghost spy working for Ragnar. The five kids discover that either Robbo, Tai or Megan is the reincarnation of the Sea Born and Ragnar is looking for them since he needs the Sea Born to escape from the coral prison. Eventually Megan finds out that Chloe is a sea ghost and this infuriates Chloe so she attempts to kill Megan. However, Megan promises not to tell the others (Megan still does not know that she is a spy) and they become best friends making Abi jealous. When Robbo is kidnapped by Ragnar, Chloe is forced to tell everyone that she has been spying for Ragnar all this time. The gang lose all trust in her and it soon transpires that Tai is the reincarnation of the Sea Born. The gang along with Chloe defeat Ragnar.

In the second series, there is no longer any threat to the inhabitants of the café. Although in the series 1 finale Ragnar said he would return, at the start of series 2 it was announced that he had gone. Each episode follows the same pattern: a sea ghost with a problem appears in the café, the kids help him or her, there are some comedic complications, and the ghost returns to the sea. New character Natasha is mistaken for a sea ghost in the first episode of series two, due to her awkward behaviour and unfashionable clothes, so each of the children in turn contrive to "accidentally" throw water at her.

Cast and characters
 Holly Bodimeade as Megan (series 1–2, 26 episodes) – Megan is the younger sister to Robbo and most kind and considerate of the group. She is most concerned about the welfare of the café and often runs it on her own. She often enjoys tidying things up and unlike her friend Abi, she is not really into fashion. She was thought to be the Sea Born until it was revealed to be Tai. She later becomes Chloe's best friend halfway through series one and is the first to find out that she was a sea ghost. During series two, Megan is the most affected when Chloe leaves but later becomes more laid-back after she promises Chloe that she would enjoy herself more.
 Pax Baldwin as Robbo (series 1–2, 26 episodes) – Robbo is Megan's older brother, he always tries to squeeze his way out of trouble, but eventually reforms and becomes more thoughtful towards his hard working sister Megan. His is best friends with Tai and is always kind to the café clients. Near the end of series one, Robbo becomes selfish and big headed and is eventually kidnapped by Ragnar but is saved by Tai after he was revealed to be the Sea Born. Robbo is more considerate and kind throughout series two and he now takes care of the café instead of sister along with Tai. In series 2 he seems to have a stronger relationship with Abi.
 Halaifonua Finau as Tai (series 1–2, 26 episodes) – Tai has lived on the island all his life and lives with his grandmother, who believes in all kinds of stories and superstitions about sea ghosts. Tai is very gullible and can be easily led at times but is also to be very strong-willed especially when his friends are in need of help. He is best friends with Robbo. Tai is revealed to be the Sea Born and eventually seals Ragnar away at the end of series one. Tai somehow loses his powers at the start of series two but unknowingly regains them after the seal holding the sea ghosts breaks again.
 Lara Custance as Abi (series 1–2, 26 episodes) – Abi has a flair for fashion, always on some sort of shopping spree, money comes easy to this chick. She lives in her mother's hotel on the island. Abi can sometimes be selfish and unkind, but she has a good heart. At first, she disliked Megan for the way she dressed however she learned from her mistakes and they later became good friends. Throughout series one she seemed to have a one sided rivalry between Chloe and was the first to believe her as a traitor. During series two, Abi is not as spoilt as she was in the first series after the hotel loses most of its guests due to the pollution. In series 2 she seems to have a stronger relationship with Robbo.
Amelia Reynolds as Chloe (series 1–2, 15 episodes) – Chloe is a 1950s babe, she is introduced as a quirky but fun character eager to make friends on the island. Her fashion style is true 1950s as is her personality and it is not until later in the series that Chloe is revealed to be a sea ghost who is working for Ragnar to find the Sea Born and kill him or her. Megan is first to find out her secret but they later become best friends. At the end of the first series Chloe betrays Ragnar and reunites with the gang. At the start of series two, she reverts to her sea ghost form and it forced to leave the island. Before leaving, she made Megan promise that she enjoy herself a lot more.
Georgia Fabish as Natasha (series 2, 13 episodes) – Natasha is introduced in series two as Peter's assistant and an amateur reporter searching for a story. She appears to be quite clumsy and often luck is not on her side but she is also quite friendly. She knows that the rest of the gang are hiding a secret from her and she is determined to find out. At the start of series two, Natasha, whilst exploring accidentally breaks the seal holding all the sea ghosts and causes all the pollution to return to the island.

Episodes

Series One (2009)

Series Two (2011)

References

External links
Paradise Café season 1 press release
Paradise Café season 2 press release
The Encyclopedia of Fantastic Film and Television entry
 
 

2009 British television series debuts
2009 New Zealand television series debuts
2011 British television series endings
2011 New Zealand television series endings
BBC children's television shows
Television shows funded by NZ on Air
Television series by Endemol
British fantasy television series
Television series about teenagers